The Art of the Motorcycle was an exhibition held at the Solomon R. Guggenheim Museum in New York City from June 26 to September 20, 1998. The exhibition's official catalog listed 95 motorcycles, plus some pre-20th century exhibits were included, bringing the total to 114. 
The exhibition was subsequently displayed at the Guggenheim Museum Bilbao in Bilbao, Spain from November 24, 1999 to September 3, 2000.
It was also the inaugural exhibition at the Guggenheim Las Vegas, located in The Venetian Resort in Las Vegas, which opened on October 7, 2001.

In the 1998 New York exhibition, there were pre-20th Century models listed separately from the main catalog.  There are four examples which date earlier than the first exhibit in the catalog proper, the 1894 Hildebrand & Wolfmüller; even though it, too, is pre-20th Century, it was chosen to lead the exhibit because it is the first series production motorcycle.

See also
List of motorcycles by type of engine
List of motorcycles of the 1920s
List of motorcycles of the 1910s

References

External links
Guggenheim Museum - Past Exhibitions - The Art of the Motorcycle (Note that the list displayed on this website is incomplete)

Motorcycle museums in the United States
Lists of motorcycles